Rybitwy may refer to the following places:
Rybitwy, part of the Podgórze district of Kraków
Rybitwy, Greater Poland Voivodeship (west-central Poland)
Rybitwy, Kuyavian-Pomeranian Voivodeship (north-central Poland)
Rybitwy, Łódź Voivodeship (central Poland)
Rybitwy, Lublin Voivodeship (east Poland)
Rybitwy, Masovian Voivodeship (east-central Poland)
Rybitwy, Świętokrzyskie Voivodeship (south-central Poland)
Rybitwy, Warmian-Masurian Voivodeship (north Poland)